The Samsung Galaxy M20 is an Android smartphone produced by Samsung Electronics. It was unveiled on 28 January 2019 and was released on 5 February 2019.

Variants

References 

Android (operating system) devices
Samsung mobile phones
Samsung smartphones
Mobile phones introduced in 2019
Samsung Galaxy
Mobile phones with multiple rear cameras